Gustavo García is a Mexican former footballer who played in the Primera División with Toluca and Correcaminos.

Club career
Born in Mexico City, García began his career in the youth ranks of local side Toluca. He played in the Toulon Tournament in 1978, and after returning had spells in the Segunda División with Azucareros de Córdoba and Veracruz. He made his Primera División debut with Toluca in 1982, and he played as a right-back for the club until 1987. García finished his career with Correcaminos, suffering a hip injury which forced him to retire in 1988.

Personal
García is the father of professional footballers, Giener, Gustavo Enrique and Giovanni.

References

External links

Living people
Mexican footballers
People from Mexico City
Year of birth missing (living people)
Association football defenders
Deportivo Toluca F.C. players
C.D. Veracruz footballers
Correcaminos UAT footballers

es:Gustavo García